The Hewe's Crab (also called Virginia Crab, Hughes's Crab and Red Hughes, is a small-sized apple that was popular for cider making in the southern United States in the 18th and 19th centuries and was grown at Monticello by Thomas Jefferson.

See also 
Heirloom plants

References

External links

Apple cultivars
American apples